Maireana  is a genus of around 57 species of perennial shrubs and herbs in the family Amaranthaceae which are endemic to Australia. Species in this genus were formerly classified within the genus Kochia. The genus was described in  1840 by the botanist, Moquin-Tandon and named to honour Joseph François Maire (1780-1867), an amateur botanist who befriended him during the author's first visit to Paris in 1834.

The type species is Maireana tomentosa.

Species include:
Maireana amoena (Diels) Paul G.Wilson
Maireana aphylla (R.Br.) Paul G.Wilson- Cotton bush or leafless bluebush
Maireana appressa (Benth.) Paul G.Wilson
Maireana astrotricha (L.A.S.Johnson) Paul G.Wilson 
Maireana atkinsiana (W.Fitzg.) Paul G.Wilson 
Maireana brevifolia (R.Br.) Paul G.Wilson- Small-leaf bluebush 
Maireana campanulata Paul G.Wilson
Maireana cannonii (J.M.Black) Paul G.Wilson
Maireana carnosa (Moq.) Paul G.Wilson
Maireana cheelii (R.H.Anderson) Paul G.Wilson
Maireana ciliata (F.Muell.) Paul G.Wilson
Maireana convexa Paul G.Wilson 
Maireana coronata (J.M.Black) Paul G.Wilson
Maireana decalvans (Gand.) Paul G.Wilson
Maireana dichoptera (F.Muell.) Paul G.Wilson
Maireana diffusa Paul G.Wilson 
Maireana enchylaenoides (F.Muell.) Paul G.Wilson
Maireana eriantha (F.Muell.) Paul G.Wilson
Maireana erioclada (Benth.) Paul G.Wilson
Maireana eriosphaera Paul G.Wilson
Maireana excavata (J.M.Black) Paul G.Wilson
Maireana georgei (Diels) Paul G.Wilson- Slit-wing bluebush or satiny bluebush
Maireana glomerifolia (F.Muell. & Tate) Paul G.Wilson
Maireana humillima (F.Muell.) Paul G.Wilson
Maireana integra (Paul G.Wilson) Paul G.Wilson
Maireana lanosa (Lindl.) Paul G.Wilson
Maireana lobiflora (Benth.) Paul G.Wilson
Maireana luehmannii (F.Muell.) Paul G.Wilson 
Maireana marginata (Benth.) Paul G.Wilson
Maireana melanocarpa Paul G.Wilson 
Maireana melanocoma (F.Muell.) Paul G.Wilson 
Maireana microcarpa (Benth.) Paul G.Wilson 
Maireana microphylla (Moq.) Paul G.Wilson
Maireana murrayana (Ewart & B.Rees) Paul G.Wilson
Maireana obrienii N.G.Walsh 
Maireana oppositifolia (F.Muell.) Paul G.Wilson
Maireana ovata (Ising) Paul G.Wilson
Maireana pentagona (R.H.Anderson) Paul G.Wilson
Maireana pentatropis (Tate) Paul G.Wilson
Maireana planifolia (F.Muell.) Paul G.Wilson
Maireana platycarpa Paul G.Wilson
Maireana polypterygia (Diels) Paul G.Wilson 
Maireana prosthecochaeta (F.Muell.) Paul G.Wilson
Maireana pyramidata (Benth.) Paul G.Wilson
Maireana radiata (Paul G.Wilson) Paul G.Wilson
Maireana rohrlachii (Paul G.Wilson) Paul G.Wilson
Maireana schistocarpa Paul G.Wilson
Maireana sclerolaenoides (F.Muell.) Paul G.Wilson
Maireana scleroptera (J.M.Black) Paul G.Wilson
Maireana sedifolia (F.Muell.) Paul G.Wilson- Pearl bluebush
Maireana sp. Patience (C.P.Campbell 1052) WA Herbarium
Maireana sp. Rainbow Valley (A91207) NT Herbarium 
Maireana spongiocarpa (F.Muell.) Paul G.Wilson 
Maireana stipitata Paul G.Wilson
Maireana suaedifolia (Paul G.Wilson) Paul G.Wilson
Maireana thesioides (C.A.Gardner) Paul G.Wilson
Maireana tomentosa Moq.
Maireana trichoptera (J.M.Black) Paul G.Wilson
Maireana triptera (Benth.) Paul G.Wilson
Maireana turbinata Paul G.Wilson
Maireana villosa (Lindl.) Paul G.Wilson

Further reading

References

External links

 
PlantNET - New South Wales Flora Online: Genus Maireana

 
Caryophyllales of Australia
Amaranthaceae genera